The 1992 Giro d'Italia was the 75th edition of the Giro d'Italia, one of cycling's Grand Tours. The Giro began in Genoa, with an individual time trial on 24 May, and Stage 11 occurred on 3 June with a stage to Imola. The race finished in Milan on 14 June.

Stage 1
24 May 1992 — Genoa,  (ITT)

Stage 2
25 May 1992 — Genoa to Uliveto Terme,

Stage 3
26 May 1992 — Uliveto Terme to Arezzo,

Stage 4
27 May 1992 — Arezzo to Sansepolcro,  (ITT)

Stage 5
28 May 1992 — Sansepolcro to Porto Sant'Elpidio,

Stage 6
29 May 1992 — Porto Sant'Elpidio to Sulmona,

Stage 7
30 May 1992 — Roccaraso to Melfi,

Stage 8
31 May 1992 — Melfi to Aversa,

Stage 9
1 June 1992 — Aversa to Latina,

Stage 10
2 June 1992 — Latina to Monte Terminillo,

Stage 11
3 June 1992 — Montepulciano to Imola,

References

1992 Giro d'Italia
Giro d'Italia stages